α-Cyclodextrin (alpha-cyclodextrin), sometimes abbreviated as α-CD, is a hexasaccharide derived from glucose. It is related to the β- (beta) and γ- (gamma) cyclodextrins, which contain seven and eight glucose units, respectively.  All cyclodextrins are white, water-soluble solids with minimal toxicity.  Cyclodextrins tend to bind other molecules in their quasi-cylindrical interiors.  This inclusion (and release) behavior leads to applications in medicine.  The compound is of wide interest because it exhibits host–guest properties, forming inclusion compounds.

Structure

In α-cyclodextrin, the six glucose subunits are linked end to end via α-1, 4 linkages.  The result has the shape of a tapered cylinder, with six primary alcohols on one face and twelve secondary alcohol groups on the other. The exterior surface of cyclodextrins is somewhat hydrophilic whereas the interior core is hydrophobic.

Applications
α-Cyclodextrin is marketed for a range of medical, healthcare, and food and beverage applications.  For drug delivery, this cyclodextrin confers aqueous solubility to hydrophobic drugs and stability to labile drugs.

Synthesis
Cyclodextrins are natural starch-conversion products. For industrial use, they are manufactured by enzymatic degradation from vegetable raw materials, such as corn or potatoes. First, the starch is liquified either by heat treatment or using α-amylase. Then cyclodextrin glycosyltransferase (CGTase) is added for enzymatic conversion. CGTases produce diverse cyclodextrins.  The selectivity of the synthesis can be improved by the addition of specific guests.

See also
 β-Cyclodextrin

References

Oligosaccharides
Macrocycles